Aemona was a Roman castrum in the Ljubljana Basin.

Aemona may also refer to:
 Aemona (Titular See), a diocese of the Roman Catholic Church
 Aemona (butterfly), a genus